The Opposition in the Australian state of New South Wales comprises the largest party or coalition of parties not in Government. The Opposition's purpose is to hold the Government to account and constitute a "Government-in-waiting" should the existing Government fall. To that end, a Leader of the Opposition and Shadow Ministers for the various government departments question the Premier and Ministers on Government policy and administration, and formulate the policy the Opposition would pursue in Government. It is sometimes styled "His Majesty's Loyal Opposition" to demonstrate that although it opposes the Government, it remains loyal to the King.

The current Leader of the Opposition is Labor Leader Chris Minns.

Current shadow cabinet

See also
 Opposition (Australia)
 Leader of the Opposition (New South Wales)

References

External links
 Opposition - Parliament of New South Wales

Politics of New South Wales